In enzymology, a 5-aminovalerate transaminase is an enzyme that catalyzes the chemical reaction

5-aminopentanoate + 2-oxoglutarate  5-oxopentanoate + L-glutamate

Thus, the two substrates of this enzyme are 5-aminopentanoate and 2-oxoglutarate, whereas its two products are 5-oxopentanoate and L-glutamate.

This enzyme belongs to the family of transferases, specifically the transaminases, which transfer nitrogenous groups.  The systematic name of this enzyme class is 5-aminopentanoate:2-oxoglutarate aminotransferase. Other names in common use include 5-aminovalerate aminotransferase, delta-aminovalerate aminotransferase, and delta-aminovalerate transaminase.  This enzyme participates in lysine degradation.  It employs one cofactor, pyridoxal phosphate.

References

 

EC 2.6.1
Pyridoxal phosphate enzymes
Enzymes of unknown structure